Eastry South railway station was a railway station on the East Kent Light Railway. It opened on 13 April 1925 and closed to passenger traffic after the last train on 30 October 1948. The station served the village of Eastry. There was a siding to the south of the station. The track was removed in May 1954.

References

Sources
 

Disused railway stations in Kent
Former East Kent Light Railway stations
Railway stations in Great Britain opened in 1925
Railway stations in Great Britain closed in 1948
1925 establishments in England
1948 disestablishments in England